Board of Radiation and Isotope Technology in short known as "BRIT" is a unit of the Department of Atomic Energy with its headquarters in Navi Mumbai, India. Board of Radiation & Isotope Technology (BRIT), the unit of Department of Atomic Energy (DAE), is focused on 
bringing the benefits of the use of radio isotope applications and radiation technology across industry, healthcare, research and 
agricultural sectors of the society.

Harnessing the spin-offs from the mainstream programmes of DAE, such as R&D programmes at Bhabha Atomic Research Centre (BARC) and Nuclear Power plants for 
generating electricity by Nuclear Power Corporation of India Limited (NPCIL), BRIT has independently created a separate visible area of contribution to the society.   
The applications of radiation and radioisotopes in the healthcare, industry, agriculture and research has proved to be one of the
most widespread peaceful uses of the nuclear sciences besides the nuclear power production.

Realizing the importance of the use of the radio isotopes for societal benefits and national development, the Department of Atomic Energy has, over the years, built up adequate infrastructure facilities for the production and applications of radioisotopes which is in the form of 
Board of Radiation & Isotope Technology (BRIT).  

BRIT continues its endeavour towards providing its best services to mankind through meeting the demands of the users, be it in the fields of nuclear medicine, healthcare or towards advanced technologies such as engineering and radiation technology equipments for medical as well as industrial uses, 
radiation processing services, isotope applications or radio analytical services.

Radio pharmaceuticals, RIA laboratories, Labelle Compounds, Radiation processing Plant, Radiation Equipment Production Facility, Column Generator Plant,   Radio analytical Laboratory, Isotope Application Services and Electron Beam facility are located at BRIT/BARC Vashi Complex in Navi Mumbai.
Marketing & Services, Sealed Sources & Logistics, ISOMED and Medical Cyclotron Facility are located at different units in Mumbai. Besides, BRIT has six regional centres located at Bengaluru, Delhi, Dibrugarh, Hyderabad, Kolkata and Kota.

Major Products

 Radio pharmaceuticals 
 Radiation Technology Equipment 
 Sealed Sources

Services Offered 

 Radiation Processing Services 
 Isotope Application
 Radio analytical Testing

Shri Pradip Mukherjee is the Chief Executive of BRIT since 1 August 2019.

Former Chief Executives of BRIT

 Shri R.G. Deshpande
 Dr. S. Gangadharan.
 Dr. N. Ramamoorthy
 Shri J.K. Ghosh
 Dr. A.K. Kohli 
 Shri G. Ganesh

References

External links
 Official Website

1989 establishments in Maharashtra
Government agencies established in 1989
Nuclear technology in India
Organisations based in Mumbai
Government agencies for energy (India)